The 1985 Texas A&M Aggies football team represented Texas A&M University in the 1985 NCAA Division I-A football season as a member of the Southwest Conference (SWC). The team was led by head coach Jackie Sherrill, in his fourth year, and played their home games at Kyle Field in College Station, Texas. They finished the season with a record of ten wins and two losses (10–2, 7–1 SWC), as Southwest Conference champions and with a victory over Auburn in the Cotton Bowl Classic.

Schedule

Roster

Rankings

Game summaries

at Alabama

at No. 14 Baylor

at No. 19 SMU

vs. No. 16 Auburn (Cotton Bowl Classic)

References

Texas AandM
Texas A&M Aggies football seasons
Southwest Conference football champion seasons
Cotton Bowl Classic champion seasons
Texas AandM Aggies football